The 2000–01 Dallas Stars season was the Stars' eighth season as the Dallas Stars and 34th overall of the franchise. The Stars qualified for the playoffs for the fifth consecutive season. They beat the Oilers in six games in the Western Conference quarterfinals but they were upset in the ensuing round by the St. Louis Blues, being swept with losses of 4–2, 2–1, 3–2 (in double overtime), and 4–1.

Offseason

Regular season

Final standings

Schedule and results

Playoffs

Round 1: (3) Dallas Stars vs. (6) Edmonton Oilers

Round 2: (3) Dallas Stars vs. (4) St. Louis Blues

Player statistics

Regular season
Scoring

Goaltending

Playoffs
Scoring

Goaltending

Awards and records

Transactions

Draft picks
Dallas's draft picks at the 2000 NHL Entry Draft held at the Pengrowth Saddledome in Calgary, Alberta.

See also
2000–01 NHL season

References
 

Dall
Dall
Dallas Stars seasons